Notzingen is a municipality in the district of Esslingen in Baden-Württemberg in southern Germany.

Geography 
Notzingen is east of the district of Esslingen, in a valley between Kirchheim unter Teck and Hochdorf.

Nearby municipalities
Wernau (Neckar)
Hochdorf (Plochingen)
Rosswälden
Schlierbach
Kirchheim unter Teck

Politics

Mayor
 1952 - 1987 Helmut Maier (independent)
 1987 – 2011 Jochen Flogaus (independent)
 from 2011 Sven Haumacher (CDU)

Municipal council 
The results of the local government elections in May 2014:

Religions 
Protestant: 1941
Roman Catholic: 815

Economy and infrastructure

Companies
Eloxal Barz GmbH und Co. KG.
Le Creuset GmbH

Education 
 Notzingen has one basic school and three kindergartens.

Notable peoples from Notzingen 
Werner Niefer (1928–1993), Manager of Mercedes-Benz AG; lived in Notzingen
Hans Ettmayer (born 1946), former Austrian football player lives in Notzingen
Johannes Muehlhaeuser (1804-1868), founder and first President of the Wisconsin Evangelical Lutheran Synod was from Notzingen.

References

External links 
 Official Internet website of Notzingen (German)

Esslingen (district)